Bob Birdsong (born 1948) is a former American bodybuilder. He competed in several IFBB and AAU bodybuilding contests, and won a number of important titles in the 1970s, including the 1974 IFBB Mr. America.

Born in Tennessee, Birdsong first competed in the 1971 AAU Mr. America coming in 21st. He followed by competing in contests, such as AAU Mr. California, AAU Mr. Western America, and IFBB Mr. International.

Early life 
Birdsong was born in Tennessee and raised in Kentucky. He described himself as a "skinny and stuttering kid" growing up. As a child, he got bullied by other children because of the name "Birdsong" and his body. At the age of fourteen, Birdsong first became interested in bodybuilding. He later attended Art Center College of Design in Pasadena, California where he studied fine art.  He also tried his hand at modeling when he was photographed for Colt Studios circa early 1970s

Contest history 
 1973 AAU Mr. Los Angeles
 1973 Mr. Pacific Coast
 1974 IFBB Mr. America
 1975 IFBB Pro Mr. Universe
 1975 IFBB Pro World Championships

References

Footnotes

Sources

External links 
 
 Bob Birdsong at Mucle Memory

Living people
1948 births
American bodybuilders
People associated with physical culture